Pairique volcanic complex is a volcanic complex in the Jujuy Province, Argentina.

The volcano features what was once thought to be a caldera, which contributed to the formation of regional ignimbrites of dacitic to rhyolitic composition. Later it was found that the volcanic complex is better described as a semicircular group of lava domes. These were emplaced on older and partly eroded lava flows. Most of these domes have been affected by lateral or centre-ward sector collapses. Eruption products associated with Pairique are the Pairique Chico block and ash flow, the Arco Jara ignimbrite and the Cerro Lucho lavas. All of these do not exceed  of volume. Right-lateral faults have affected the area.

Pairique formed during the late Miocene between 8 and 6.7 million years ago, when volcanism reactivated on the Argentine side of the Puna. Later dates imply volcanic activity between 11.5 and 10.3 million years ago. Pairique is part of the Altiplano-Puna volcanic complex, although the volcanic eruptions of Pairique were less extensive than these from many other APVC volcanoes. Pairique is often considered to be the oldest caldera of the APVC.

The younger Cerro Morado volcanic centre is close. It erupted later than Pairique. The ignimbrites of Cerro Guacha and Coranzuli crop out northwest and east of Pairique, respectively. Some volcanic rocks once attributed to Pairique seem to come from neighbouring volcanic centres such as Lina, Nevado Torona-San Pedro and Pairique Grande.

The non-volcanic basement is formed by the Ordovician sediments which crop out in neighbouring mountain ranges, and by the Tertiary Peña Colorada formation. The Rio Pairique originates within the volcanic complex and together with the Rio Aguas Calientes from the northwest forms the Rio Rosario, which drains to the southeast. Hot springs are found in the area.

Volcanic rocks at Pairique include dacite with cordierite inclusions. Older lavas feature rhyodacite intrusions. Mineral deposits are associated with Pairique.

References

Sources 

 
 

Miocene lava domes
Volcanoes of Argentina